Giorgio Nataletti  (1907-1972)  was an Italian musicologist, the first director of the Ethnomusicological Archives at the National Academy of Santa Cecilia in Rome.

He was in charge of a vast project from 1948–72 to record traditional Italian music. It was done under the auspices of RAI, the Italian Radio and Television agency. The results are preserved in the RAI archives as well as those of the National Academy of Santa Cecilia.

1907 births
1972 deaths
Academic staff of the Accademia Nazionale di Santa Cecilia
20th-century Italian musicians
20th-century Italian musicologists